The Carolina Cobras are a professional indoor football team in the National Arena League (NAL) and that began play for the 2018 season.  Based in Greensboro, North Carolina, the Cobras play their home games at the Greensboro Coliseum Complex.

The Cobras is the third indoor/arena team to call Greensboro home, following the Greensboro Prowlers of the af2 (2000–2003) and the Greensboro Revolution of the National Indoor Football League (2006–2007).  A previous team called the Carolina Cobras played in the Arena Football League from 2000 until 2004. The AFL Cobras played three seasons in Raleigh and two in Charlotte before folding. The NAL Cobras use a logo similar in style to the defunct AFL Cobras' logo, but otherwise has no direct connection to the AFL franchise.

History
The Cobras were officially announced as members of the National Arena League (NAL) on December 4, 2017.  In their introductory announcement, the team named former Cincinnati Commandos, Texas Revolution, Nashville Venom and Wichita Falls Nighthawks head coach Billy Back as their new coach. 

The Cobras inaugural season finished with a regular season record of 10–5, taking second place in the league. The Cobras then defeated the Jacksonville Sharks in the playoff semifinal and earned the right to host the 2018 NAL Championship game at home after the first place Massachusetts Pirates lost their semifinal to the Columbus Lions. With the Lions missing several starting players including their quarterback Mason Espinosa and all running backs, the Cobras dominated Columbus in the championship game 66–8.

In their second season, the Cobras again made it to the championship game, where they lost to the Sharks 52–48. Following the season, head coach Billy Back and most of his staff left the team to coach the relaunched Spokane Shock in the Indoor Football League when the NAL was announced to merge with Champions Indoor Football for the 2020 season. The Cobras initially hired Massachusetts Pirates' head coach Anthony Payton after the Pirates withdrew from the league due to the merger. However, the merger fell apart and the team then hired former defensive coordinator Josh Resignalo as head coach in December 2019.

On September 22, 2022, head coach and general manager Josh Resignalo stepped down to "explore other opportunities".  The next day, on September 13, the Cobras announced that their offensive coordinator and arena football veteran James Fuller would be tapped as only the team's third head coach in franchise history.

Season-by-season results

Current roster

Head coaches
Note: Statistics are correct through the 2022 National Arena League regular season.

References

External links
 Carolina Cobras official site

2017 establishments in North Carolina
American football teams in North Carolina
National Arena League teams
American football teams established in 2017
Sports in Greensboro, North Carolina